The Baldwin DS-4-4-750 was a four-axle  diesel-electric switcher built by the Baldwin Locomotive Works at it Eddystone, Pennsylvania factory between 1949 and 1951. It was a bridge between the  DS-4-4-660 and the S-8. It was the low power companion in Baldwin's catalog to their DS-4-4-1000 and the S-12.

Original owners

Page 40 of the Dolzall brothers book "Diesels from Eddystone" describes the DR-4-4-750 as a "Horsepower boost for a lagging seller."  Baldwin dropped the DR-4-4-660 model and introduced the new 750 HP DR-4-4-750. The Atchison, Topeka & Santa Fe (AT&SF) purchased nine in August 1948 and 21 units were sold in 1949 to six different customers.

References

DS-4-4-0750
B-B locomotives
Diesel-electric locomotives of the United States
Railway locomotives introduced in 1949
Standard gauge locomotives of the United States
Shunting locomotives